XOVER is a Network News Transfer Protocol (NNTP) command used to return information from a news server's overview (NOV) database.

The XOVER command is documented in RFC 2980, a specification for Common NNTP Extensions authored by Stan O. Barber in October 2000. A newer version of NNTP, specified in RFC 3977, formalized the XOVER extension with new OVER and LIST OVERVIEW.FMT commands.

See also
 List of Usenet newsreaders
 Usenet newsgroup
 News server

References

Usenet